The New South Wales Operating Theatre Association Incorporated better known as the Operating Theatre Association Inc. (NSWOTA, NSW OTA or OTA) is an Australian State and a Territory-based non-profit perioperative nursing professional association that fosters professionalism and professional development for more than 1000 perioperative registered nurses and enrolled nurses across New South Wales (NSW) and the Australian Capital Territory (ACT).  It’s one of the local associations that are part of the national body, the Australian College of Operating Room Nurses (ACORN).

History

Formation
During 1956, three operating room supervisors – Miss Spense (from Royal North Shore Hospital), Miss Sturtridge (from the Royal Alexandra Hospital for Children), and Sister Mary Garbriel (from St Vincent's Hospital, Sydney) – with the help of the Registered Nurse representative of Johnson & Johnson Pty. Ltd. realised the need for these supervisors to meet, share ideas, provide support for each other, and allow for progress in this field of nursing.  Through their insight, the Theatre Supervisors' Group of NSW was inaugurated in July 1957, with Sister Mary Gabriel as the first President.  Contact with metropolitan Sydney hospitals' room supervisors brought new members into the Theatre Supervisors' Group of NSW.
The Theatre Supervisors' Group of NSW supplied answers to many problems that were discussed at the time, with Saturday lectures held at St. Vincent's Hospital. This followed with the meetings being held at different metropolitan hospitals, where networking among members from different hospitals and conducting tours of their operating rooms.

Name change, membership and expansion
It was decided that the Theatre Supervisors' Group of NSW was too restricted and so the name of the Group was altered to the New South Wales Operating Theatre Association in 1962.  This allowed all registered nurses employed in operating suites to join and collaboratively work on issues.
Membership gradually grew to encompass the Sydney, Newcastle, New South Wales & Wollongong metropolitan areas, the NSW country areas and the ACT.  From the initial membership of three people in 1957, there was a rapid increase in membership due to the widening of the membership criteria and since that time, membership has increased: by 1985 to over 500 and in recent times to around 1200. Incorporation of the NSW OTA occurred in 1991.

Zones 

By 1972, the executive committee recognised the need to create grouping of members by geographical location and so NSW & ACT were split into Zones.
 Zone 0 – Sydney metropolitan area
 Zone 1 – Hunter Region and Central Coast (New South Wales) areas
 Zone 2 – Central West (New South Wales) areas
 Zone 3 – New England (New South Wales) and Orana (New South Wales) areas
 Zone 4 – Riverina and Murray River areas
 Zone 5 – North Coast (New South Wales) areas
 Zone 6 – Illawarra and Southern Highlands (New South Wales) areas
 Zone 7 – Australian Capital Territory

Annual Conference
The NSW OTA holds an annual conference.  It is currently the event that holds the Perioperative Nurse Excellence Awards and Life Membership.

Notes

Medical and health organisations based in New South Wales
Organizations established in 1957
1957 establishments in Australia
Nursing organisations in Australia
Hospital nursing